Megachile nigroscopula is a species of bee in the family Megachilidae. It was described by Yan-Ru Wu in 1982.

References

Nigroscopula
Insects described in 1982